"Back at One" is a song written and performed by American recording artist Brian McKnight, taken from his fifth studio album of the same name (1999). The single was released on August 9, 1999.

Chart performance
"Back at One" went on to be one of McKnight's biggest successes, reaching the top ten in New Zealand, Canada and the United States, where it eventually peaked at number two for eight weeks but was kept off of the top spot by "Smooth" by Santana.

Music video
The music video was directed by Francis Lawrence and was nominated for R&B video of the year in the Music Video Production Association Awards.

Charts

Weekly charts

Year-end charts

Certifications

Release history

Mark Wills version

American country music artist Mark Wills covered "Back at One" on his 2000 album Permanently, also releasing it as that album's first single. Released in October 1999 (two months after McKnight's version), Wills' cover peaked at number two on the Billboard country singles charts for a week. Despite not reaching the top spot in the US, the song did manage to reach number one on the Canadian RPM country tracks. In addition to his country chart success, "Back at One" also became his fifth entry on the Hot 100 charts, peaking at number 36 there.

Music video
The music video was directed by Jim Hershleder.

Charts

Year-end charts

Other versions
McKnight also performed the song with Brazilian singer Ivete Sangalo on her album Festa (en: Party).

In 2000, keyboardist Bob Baldwin released a cover of the song from the album BobBaldwin.com.
Also in 2000, Jamaican reggae and dancehall singer Sanchez recorded a reggae cover version of the song over the "Fi Wi Rock" rhythm produced by King Jammy which became a popular dancehall hit in Jamaica and the US. Irish boy band Westlife duetted with Lulu in 2002.

In 2001, UK music artist Lulu recorded the song for her album Together with a duet with Irish pop band Westlife and performed it live subsequently.

In 2003, Smooth jazz guitarist and musician Paul Jackson, Jr. covered the song as the closing track from the album Still Small Voice.

Another instrumental rendition of this song has been performed by saxophonist Warren Hill, from his album 2005 PopJazz.

In 2006, British pop singer Shayne Ward also performed this song on his debut album Shayne Ward.

Singer Mijares covered it in his 2009 Spanish album Vivir Así.

References

1999 singles
1999 songs
Brian McKnight songs
List songs
Lulu (singer) songs
Mark Wills songs
Mercury Nashville singles
Motown singles
Music videos directed by Francis Lawrence
Song recordings produced by Carson Chamberlain
Songs written by Brian McKnight
Westlife songs